Superboy is an American television series based on the fictional DC comic book character Superman's early years as Superboy. The show ran from 1988–1992 in syndication. It was renamed The Adventures of Superboy at the start of the third season.

Production history
The Superboy series was brought to the screen by executive producers Ilya and Alexander Salkind, the producers of the first three Superman films and the 1984 Supergirl film. This series and the release of the 1988 Superman animated series on CBS coincided with the 50th anniversary celebrations of the Superman character that year. Ironically, the series came about a year after DC Comics had "erased" the character of Superboy from their continuity in the Man of Steel reboot by John Byrne. Nevertheless, the show went on in October 1988 with John Haymes Newton playing the lead role of Superboy/Clark Kent, along with Stacy Haiduk as love interest Lana Lang and Jim Calvert as Clark's college roommate T.J. White. In the Philippines, the series premiered on People's Television Network on September 4, 1989.

Superboy was the first weekly TV series to be produced at the then new Disney/MGM Studios. For the second season onward, the series moved several miles up Interstate 4 to Universal Studios Florida, the largest motion picture and television-sound facility outside Hollywood, where it was then showcased as that studio's first weekly television product.

At first, much of the action centered around stories that Clark and T.J. reported on for the college newspaper, the Shuster Herald. All the exterior scenes shot at "Shuster University" are actually filmed on the main campus of the University of Central Florida. Siegelville, however, was depicted as a coastal city, as evidenced by imagery of both the new and old Sunshine Skyway Bridges (Interstate 275) in St. Petersburg, Florida in the opening credits.

Superboy was scripted by many actual comic-book writers. Superman editors Mike Carlin and Andrew Helfer penned several episodes, such as "The Alien Solution", its sequel "Revenge of the Alien" and "The Bride of Bizarro". Other comic book writers that contributed to the series include Denny O'Neil, Cary Bates, J. M. DeMatteis and Mark Evanier.

Clark Kent/Superboy attends the Siegel School of Journalism at Shuster University in Shusterville, Florida – names which reference Superman's creators, Jerry Siegel and Joe Shuster.

Season breakdown

Season 1
The first season of the series, which began airing in October 1988, focused on Clark Kent / Superboy (John Haymes Newton), his childhood friend and love interest Lana Lang (Stacy Haiduk) and his college roommate T.J. White (Jim Calvert), son of Daily Planet editor Perry White. Scott James Wells played Superboy's nemesis Lex Luthor. Clark's adoptive parents, Jonathan and Martha Kent, were portrayed by Stuart Whitman and Salome Jens, respectively.

In an interview with Boys' Life prior to the show's debut, Newton spoke of the importance of overall character development and his focus would both be on Superboy and Clark Kent: "When Clark is not Superboy, he ought to be a well-rounded individual. I think people have gotten tired of seeing the nerdy Clark after four movies".

Thirteen episodes were initially filmed for Season 1, beginning with "Countdown to Nowhere". This episode featured Superboy's first public appearance as he prevents a group of saboteurs from selling a powerful laser weapon developed by the U.S. government to an arms dealer. "Countdown to Nowhere" aired in two versions: an "uncut" version in which the story plays in the present day and a second version in which the main story is introduced as a flashback through two additional scenes with Lana, Clark and T.J. The second version contained some scenes cut from the main story in order to fit the flashback lead-ins into the episode. This episode is the first episode of the series chronologically, but was the fifth one that was aired in most markets. It also appears as the fifth episode on the first season DVD set. The first season's story editor was Fred Freiberger, who also scripted a few episodes.

The first thirteen episodes of Superboy were rather crude compared to later episodes. The producers, not sure whether any additional episodes would be ordered, did their best to save money on the first thirteen. As a result, the special effects are a bit rougher and the episodes have a grittier, real-world feel to them. This brought about more character-oriented stories and stories with more ordinary villains like drug dealers and crime bosses.

After thirteen additional episodes were ordered for the first season, special effects improved and the show took on a more professional look. More fantastic enemies were introduced, such as an unnamed gaseous alien, who could possess the bodies of others in "The Alien Solution", a life-force vampire in "Succubus" and long-time Superman villain Mister Mxyzptlk (guest star Michael J. Pollard) in "Meet Mr. Mxyzptlk".

Superboy's nemesis, Lex Luthor, was introduced in "The Jewel of Techechal" (the first episode broadcast) as Clark's classmate at Shuster University. This version of Luthor was more interested in fixing basketball games and humiliating Superboy than anything else. But the season one finale, "Luthor Unleashed", completely changed his character. This episode adapted Lex Luthor's silver age comic book origin, in which Superboy rescues Lex from a lab accident that causes him to lose all of his hair, becoming the familiar bald villain Superman fans have come to recognize. Luthor blames Superboy for his hair loss and gains a new, more intense hatred for the Boy of Steel. From this point on in the series, Luthor is determined to destroy Superboy, rather than just humiliate him.

Season 2
In the second season, drastic changes took place. The producers of the show were not enamored of Newton's portrayal of Superboy. He was replaced by Gerard Christopher in the lead role. A new direction was made this season with the second season's stories guided by Executive Story Consultants Mark Jones and Cary Bates.

Scott Wells was also replaced as Lex Luthor by Sherman Howard. The change in Luthor's appearance was explained in the second season opener "With This Ring, I Thee Kill". The two-part episode revealed Luthor had plastic surgery to assume the appearance of Warren Eckworth, the wealthy inventor of the "Superboy Gun", which Luthor believed could kill Superboy. The character of T.J. White was written out of the series (he went to work for the Daily Planet) and Andy McCalister, portrayed by Ilan Mitchell-Smith, became Clark's new roommate. Andy was very different from T.J. and was constantly looking to make money with his get-rich-quick schemes. He also flirted with Lana frequently and his advances were always refused, though Lana did consider Andy a friend.

The villains were amped up in the second season, as additional comic book characters were introduced to the series, many of them appearing for the first time in live-action. Metallo (Michael Callan), Bizarro (Barry Meyers) as well as the Yellow Peri (Elizabeth Keifer) appeared in the second season and Mister Mxyzptlk (Pollard) made a return appearance. Gilbert Gottfried appeared in two episodes as a nasty, wisecracking criminal genius named "Nick Knack" who used toys to commit crimes (a reference to the Toyman). Another character was a dhampir who found a way through a serum to gain human abilities such as repelling his craving for blood and gaining a tolerance for sunlight. Thus, he became a friend of both Superboy and Lana but would become villainous if doing without the serum for too long. Philip Michael Thomas also made an appearance as a medieval alchemist who survived into modern times in order to battle a sorcerer spreading plague, and aided Superboy when he was infected by said disease. The episode "Superboy... Rest in Peace" featured guest star Betsy Russell, who was reunited with series star Gerard Christopher for the first time since the two had worked together previously in the 1985 movie Tomboy. Also notable is the guest star appearance of former James Bond actor George Lazenby and Bond girl actress Britt Ekland as aliens disguised as Superboy's Kryptonian father and mother, Jor-El and Lara, in two episodes, "Abandon Earth" and "Escape to Earth".

Season 3
With the third season, the series saw more changes. The show's title officially became The Adventures of Superboy and the setting shifted from Shuster University to The Bureau for Extra-Normal Matters in Capitol City, Florida, where Clark and Lana were interns. The Bureau is depicted as a government agency which investigates paranormal activities and aliens, including Superboy (this format change pre-dates the concept of the television series The X-Files).

Andy McCalister was dropped from the series, though Ilan Mitchell-Smith would make a final guest appearance in the episode "Special Effects", which explained his disappearance by saying that Andy went to intern at a movie studio. The new supporting cast consisted of Clark and Lana's co-worker at the Bureau, Matt Ritter (Peter Jay Fernandez) and the Bureau chief C. Dennis Jackson (Robert Levine).

The tone of the series changed dramatically as darker stories were produced and the overall look of the series took on many characteristics of film noir. A few journalists at the time suggested that this darker look was largely due to the success of Tim Burton's Batman movie from a year prior. Many stories dealt with more mature themes, a change new producer Julia Pistor implemented. In "Rebirth", Superboy is confronted with the possibility that he may have accidentally taken a human life and gives up his Superboy identity in guilt. "Carnival" shows a demonic individual named 'Deville' trying to acquire Superboy's eternal soul by tempting him to give in and kill a man who is implied to be a rapist. "Mindscape" deals with Superboy's deepest fears as an alien life-form brings those fears to life in Superboy's nightmares while simultaneously draining his life energy. "Roads Not Taken" shows the different paths Superboy's life may have taken, as Superboy travels to alternate earths where his life is very different. He meets a version of himself who killed Luthor in a fit of rage and another who has become a despotic ruler of earth. The alternate version of Superboy who took Luthor's life was shown wearing a black leather jacket and sunglasses which bears some resemblance to the Conner Kent version of Superboy as he first appeared in the "Death of Superman" storyline. The third season ended with the two-part episode "The Road to Hell" with former TV Tarzan Ron Ely guest-starring as an adult, retired Man of Steel from an alternate reality.

Season 4
The fourth season maintained the darker look and feel of the third one and was the first in which no major cast changes took place. Noel Neill and Jack Larson made guest appearances in the episode "Paranoia" as employees of the Bureau for Extra-Normal Matters. Neill had originated the role of Lois Lane in the 1948 Superman and 1950 Atom Man vs. Superman film serials and replaced Phyllis Coates in the role in the 1950s Adventures of Superman TV series before originating the role of Lois' mother, Ella/Ellen Lane, in 1978's Superman; Larson co-starred as Jimmy Olsen in Adventures of Superman with Neill. The trend of more mature stories also continued in episodes such as "To Be Human", in which Bizarro becomes human, only to be forced to give up his humanity to save Superboy's life and "Into the Mystery", in which a mystical, ghostly woman, apparently an angel of death, leads Superboy to his dying aunt's bedside. A memorable Luthor tale, "Know Thine Enemy", appeared in this season, featuring Superboy re-living Luthor's tortured memories of childhood via "psychodisk" while Luthor threatened to destroy all life on Earth.

Comic book tie-in 

DC Comics published a tie-in comic book series during the TV show's run, launching the comic during the TV series' second season. Superboy (Volume 2) is different from any other Superman or Superboy titles in that it is set in the continuity of the Superboy television series, as opposed to the regular DC Universe. Its intent was to explore some of the unseen tales and events that the TV series could not. The series originally carried the cover title Superboy: The Comic Book<ref>{{gcdb series|id=4002|title=Superboy vol. 2'}}</ref> with issue #1 having a photo cover with the show's stars Gerard Christopher and Stacy Haiduk (dated Feb. 1990), although the title in the indicia was simply Superboy. After issue #11, the series changed its cover title to The Adventures of Superboy as the TV series itself had changed titles starting with season three, and the change was reflected in the comic book's indicia beginning with #18. The series was published monthly until it went bi-monthly for its final three issues, remained in publication for 22 issues to the end of 1991 (cover dated Feb. 1992), and a concluding one issue special in 1992.

Series end
Although the Superboy series was still popular, the fourth season was to be its last. The finale was to be titled "Obituary for a Superhero" and Superboy was supposed to appear to meet his demise at the hands of Lex Luthor in a cliffhanger ending. The intent of the Salkinds was to make a series of television movies, which would resolve the cliffhanger and see Superboy's return. A series of events that occurred during the fourth season resulted in those plans changing.

Alexander and Ilya Salkind had been connected with the Superman franchise since they struck a licensing agreement with Warner Communications, the parent company of both Warner Bros. and DC Comics, in the 1970s. This enabled the father-son tandem to produce any project they so desired with several Superman related properties, and they took advantage of this by producing three films starring Christopher Reeve as Superman. While the first and second films were critical and financial successes, the third was not. The Salkinds sold their Superman film license to The Cannon Group, which produced a fourth Superman film that also flopped.

Since the agreement with Warner was still in effect, and since they still had some of the properties within the Superman canon to work with, Alexander and Ilya decided to develop a television series with Superboy as the focus. This was done despite the previously mentioned 1986 retconning of the origins of Superman by John Byrne, which deleted Superboy from his existence. Nevertheless, Superboy was launched in 1988 with DC Comics serving as a production entity, giving Warner Bros. a stake in the production. The Salkinds agreed with Viacom to distribute the series.

In 1991 Jenette Kahn, president of DC Comics, was interested in bringing Superman back to television and tasked Deborah Joy LeVine and Les Moonves of the parent company's television department to come up with a concept. Using the new series canon created by Byrne, LeVine and Moonves developed what was to become Lois & Clark: The New Adventures of Superman, and ABC showed interest in picking it up. The new series was to launch in 1993.

Shortly thereafter, Warner Bros. notified Alexander and Ilya that they were exercising their rights to terminate their licensing agreement and retaking possession of any remaining Superman-related intellectual property the Salkinds had licenses for. This decision meant that once the final episodes for the season were completed, Superboy would immediately cease production; this also meant that the planned series of telefilms would have to be scrapped and the intended series finale, "Obituary For a Superhero", would have to be rewritten. The writers instead came up with a new final episode, a two-part episode titled "Rites of Passage", to close the series.

The Salkinds decided to challenge Warner Bros. in court over the rights to their Superboy series; a lengthy period of legal wrangling ended with a settlement. The terms of the settlement were:
 Warner Bros. gained full control of the Superman franchise's films and television series with the exception of Superman IV; although Warner Bros. distributed the film, TV syndication passed to Warner's competitor Paramount after it acquired television rights to the library of the film's co-producer The Cannon Group. Full rights to the film have since been assumed by Warner Bros.
 Control of the Superboy television series is shared. Ilya Salkind holds his family's stake in the show, having inherited his father's share when Alexander died in 1997. StudioCanal also holds rights as they purchased the Salkinds' production company after it folded in the 1990s. Distribution rights are shared by CBS Media Ventures, which is the successor-in-interest to Viacom and holds domestic distribution rights, and Warner Bros. Television, which holds international rights. Warner Bros. also has home media distribution rights to the series.

Cast
John Haymes Newton (season 1) and Gerard Christopher (season 2–4) as Kal-El / Clark Kent / Superboy
Stacy Haiduk as Lana Lang
Scott James Wells (season 1) and Sherman Howard (season 2–4) as Lex Luthor
Stuart Whitman as Jonathan Kent
Salome Jens as Martha Kent
Barry Meyers as Bizarro
Michael Callan as Roger Corben / Metallo
Denise Gossett as Lena Luthor
Jennifer Hawkins as young Lena Luthor
Jim Calvert (season 1) as Trevor Jenkins "T.J." White
George Chakiris (season 1–2) as Professor Peterson
Ilan Mitchell-Smith (season 2; season 3 guest appearance, 1 episode) as Andy McCalister
Peter Jay Fernandez (season 3–4) as Matt Ritter 
Robert Levine (season 3–4) as C. Dennis Jackson
Zevi Wolmark (season 3–4) as Christopher Grimes
Gilbert Gottfried (season 2, 2 episodes) as Nick Knack
Michael Manno as Leo
Roger Pretto as Lt. Zeke Harris
Tracy Roberts as Darla
Robert Hope as a stunt coordinator
Peggy O'Neal as Death / Azrael (season 3, 1 episode) and a wife (season 4, 1 episode)

Home media
Bootleg VHS and DVDs
Some time after the series' cancellation, there was a dispute over what rights to the character the Salkinds actually owned. For a time this prevented any official home video release of the series. Between 1992 and 2006 the only way to see Superboy in the United States was by ordering bootleg VHS and DVD copies of the series sold on eBay and other websites. The audio and video quality of these copies was varied.

In 1999, Gerard Christopher began offering three VHS tapes of the series created from his personal master tapes (Christopher has masters of all of the episodes he starred in, Seasons 2–4). Each video tape featured four episodes (which were selected episodes from Seasons 3 and 4) and was sold on his website for a price of $25–$30 US. A fourth VHS video tape was released by Christopher in 2002. Christopher not only sold these video tapes on his website by mail order, but also sold them at personal appearances when attending various comic book conventions and shows. He had offered other Superboy merchandise for sale, such as autographed photos and episode scripts. All merchandise from Christopher was also autographed.

In response to overwhelming fan demand, from a private email sent by Christopher (only to the fans who had previously ordered merchandise from his website) , he decided to offer all Superboy episodes on DVD, offering a complete Season 2 set on DVD in early June 2004 and planned to sell complete sets of Seasons 3 and 4 in the future. The Adventures of Superboy: Season 2 Episodes DVD set consisted of three discs (in DVD-R format), was produced by Christopher himself, and sold for a price of $159.00 US (due to their past loyalty fans who had previously ordered merchandise from Christopher's website were able to pre-purchase the Season 2 DVD set at the reduced price of $129.00 US for a limited time before June 30, 2004 as this offer was by invitation only). The latter two seasons were planned to be sold at a reduced cost. Tapes and DVDs sold by Christopher were the best quality copies of the series available, since they were made from master tapes, rather than from off-air recordings like all other bootleg copies.

When Warner Home Video announced the official release of Season 1, Christopher announced that his self-produced DVD sets would no longer be available on his website in 2005, with the planned DVD releases for Seasons 3 and 4 cancelled.

Aftermath of the first legal battle
In an interview for the webpage supermanhomepage.com, Salkind revealed that the legal battle between the three companies involved in the series' production (Viacom, Warner Bros. and the Salkinds) was the reason the show was not re-run on television or released to home video. This dispute was settled circa 2005, allowing the series to be released on DVD.

DVD release summary
The Complete First Season
The DVD set includes a behind-the-scenes featurette with new interviews with first-season Clark Kent/Superboy actor John Haymes Newton, actors Stacy Haiduk and James Calvert, creative/executive producer Ilya Salkind as well as director David Nutter. The DVD also features the screen test of John Haymes Newton and audio commentaries by Ilya Salkind and Newton on two key episodes ("Revenge of the Alien" Part 2 and "Meet Mr. Mxyzptlk"). The DVD was released in advance of the film Superman Returns.

The Complete Second Season
After a six-and-a-half years gap, Warner Bros. released the complete second season of Superboy on DVD via its Warner Archive Collection on December 11, 2012. This is a manufacture-on-demand (MOD) release, available exclusively through Warner's online store and only in the US, as well as Amazon.com through their CreateSpace service, which ships globally.

The Complete Third Season
Warner Bros. released the complete third season of Superboy on July 16, 2013, via MOD, through Warner Archive, as well as Amazon.com through their CreateSpace service, which ships globally.

The Complete Fourth Season
The fourth season was listed at warnerarchive.com for an October 29, 2013 release date. For a limited time, copies of the DVD set were autographed by series star Gerard Christopher; the non-autographed version becomes available upon exhaustion of the autographed inventory. It is also available from Amazon.com through their CreateSpace service, which ships globally.

Streaming
All four seasons were made available in 2018 for streaming on DC Universe, a paid streaming subscription specializing in DC Comics-related content. As the episodes were shot and edited on film in 4:3 (then transferred to videotape), these episodes are presented in standard definition at their original 4:3 display ratio.

References

Further reading
 Daniels, Les. "Superboy On TV". DC Comics: Sixty Years of the World's Favorite Comic Book Heroes. New York: Little, Brown, & Company, 1995.
 Daniels, Les. Superman: The Complete History''. San Francisco: Chronicle Books, 1998.

External links

1988 American television series debuts
1992 American television series endings
Superboy
1980s American college television series
1980s American science fiction television series
1990s American college television series
1990s American science fiction television series
English-language television shows
First-run syndicated television programs in the United States
Superman television series
Television series about teenagers
Television shows based on DC Comics
Television shows set in Florida
Television shows set in Kansas
Television series by CBS Studios
Television series by Warner Bros. Television Studios